Novopokrovka is the name of several inhabited localities in Russia:

Urban localities
Novopokrovka, Tambov Oblast, an urban-type settlement in Tambov Oblast

Rural localities
Novopokrovka, Primorsky Krai, a selo in Primorsky Krai
Novopokrovka, Voronezh Oblast, a settlement in Voronezh Oblast
Novopokrovka, name of several other rural localities